Rastgordan (also Romanized as Rāstgordān; also known as Rāst Kordān) is a village in Esfandan Rural District, in the Central District of Komijan County, Markazi Province, Iran. At the 2006 census, its population was 116, in 28 families.

References 

Populated places in Komijan County